The 1934 Cincinnati Reds season was their second and final in the league. The team failed to improve on their previous output of 3–6–1, losing eight games. They failed to qualify for the playoffs for the second consecutive season. The team was shut out in six of their eight games, losing 64–0 in Week 8 and folding as a franchise.

The team played each of the four home games at different stadiums: Crosley Field, Dayton's Triangle Park, Portsmouth's Universal Stadium, and Xavier University's Corcoran Stadium in a rare night game against the Chicago Cardinals.

The 1934 Reds surrendered 6.40 rushing yards per attempt, the worst figure in professional football history. They are the only team in NFL history to surrender more than five yards per carry.

The team was purchased by the St. Louis Gunners, who finished out the remainder of the Reds' schedule.

Schedule

Standings

References

Cincinnati Reds (NFL) seasons
Cincinnati Reds (NFL)
Cincinnati Reds NFL
National Football League winless seasons